Yourcodenameis:milo were an English alternative rock/experimental/post-hardcore band from Washington, Tyne and Wear. Their mini album, All Roads to Fault, was released in 2004, followed in 2005 by the full length album Ignoto, both on Fiction/Polydor Records. In 2006, the band left their Polydor contract and within a month signed a new record deal with V2 Records. In November 2006, the band released Print Is Dead Vol 1, a side project album featuring collaborations with other bands. Their second full-length album, They Came from the Sun, was released in 2007.

The band reformed in 2020 to perform a set of charity concerts in aid of The Cluny in Newcastle.

History

All Roads to Fault and Ignoto
The band's first mini album, All Roads to Fault, was recorded by Steve Albini and released in 2004. It was followed by the full-length album Ignoto, in 2005, which was released on Fiction/Polydor Records. In 2006, the band left their Polydor contract and within a month signed a new record deal with V2 Records. In November 2006, the band released Print Is Dead Vol 1, a side project album featuring collaborations with other bands. The band's second full-length album, They Came from the Sun, was released on 2 April 2007.

Print is Dead Vol 1
On 6 November 2006, the band released its first side project album, entitled Print Is Dead Vol 1. The album has Youcodenameis:Milo collaborating with other bands, including Tom Vek, Get Cape. Wear Cape. Fly, The Futureheads, Field Music, Reuben, The Automatic, Martin Grech, Hot Club De Paris, Maxïmo Park, Lethal Bizzle and Bloc Party. Print Is Dead was recorded between sessions for Yourcodenameis:milo's second album and during their trip to play shows in New Delhi, India. The album was written, recorded and mixed at the band's own studio under the arches of Byker Bridge and affectionately named Like A Cat, Like A Fox, after the original title for their first album.

On 16 January 2006, the band announced that drummer Paul Gamble-Beresford had left under amicable circumstances and was to be replaced by Shaun Abbott.

They Came From the Sun
The band released its second full-length studio album, They Came from the Sun, on 2 April 2007. They also set up their own General Recordings imprint through V2 and begun work on more recordings for Print Is Dead Volume II, in addition to a number of Brian Eno-inspired ambient works which may one day be released.

Justin Lockey was absent during all live performances for the band's UK tours in 2007, due to a shoulder injury.

Hiatus
The band announced a decision to go on an indefinite hiatus on 21 August 2007. In a statement they said:

Mullen has, however, suggested that Milo were likely to return in the future, saying, "I have mentioned in the past that Milo isn't dead. Just resting. He's got some unfinished business. When will he wake? I don't know. Once in a while Mullen meets with his old friends in The Cluny and has a big fuck off burger. Maybe when the burgers run out."

On 19 October 2007,  Rock Sound reported that Paul Mullen would be the new addition to the band The Automatic, not necessarily replacing the keyboard player Alex Pennie but taking on the role of rhythm guitarist, backing vocalist and occasionally keyboards.

On 26 November 2007, the guitarist Justin Lockey's new band, British Expeditionary Force, released its first album, Chapter One: A Long Way From Home, to critical acclaim.

The band's second drummer, Shaun Abbott, is currently a member of the Newcastle band We Are Knuckle Dragger. Adam Hiles plays guitar with The Eye Jab, now Mammal Club. He also dedicates at least five hours a month to tracking unexplained phenomena such as UFOs and Big Foot Ross Harley joined Tomahawks For Targets.

Style and influences
Yourcodenameis:milo's style was influenced by earlier post-hardcore/progressive bands, especially Cave In, Cable, Shellac, Fugazi and At the Drive-In. Themes such as space and sci-fi dominate its sound and elements, such as track titles and artwork, are often quirky and in-line with a very specific motif that the band created for itself. On the early releases a distinct lyrical style was perhaps most evident, with Mullen often singing disjointed and abstract phrases which did not form part of a clear narrative. The influence of Radiohead was apparent in All Roads To Fault and Ignoto, where Mullen often sang about technological and mechanical failure, conveying a sense of bewilderment and confusion. The artwork for these releases was in fitting with these lyrical themes, with the cover of Ignoto portraying a seated man clasping his own hand against his mouth.

Members
 Paul Mullen - vocals, guitar, synthesizer
 Adam Hiles - guitar
 Justin Lockey - guitar
 Ross Harley - bass guitar
 Shaun Abbott - drums, percussion

 Former members
 Paul 'Bez' Gamble-Beresford - drums, percussion (2002–2006)

Discography

References

External links
 

English alternative rock groups
Musical groups from Newcastle upon Tyne
British post-hardcore musical groups
Kerrang! Awards winners
Fiction Records artists
V2 Records artists